Persatuan Sepak Bola Indonesia Kulon Progo (simply known as Persikup Kulon Progo) is an Indonesian football club based in Kulon Progo Regency, Special Region of Yogyakarta. They currently compete in the Liga 3.

References

External links

Kulon Progo Regency
Football clubs in Indonesia
Football clubs in the Special Region of Yogyakarta
Association football clubs established in 1976
1976 establishments in Indonesia